Life of Riley: The Lightning Seeds Collection is the second compilation by British alternative rock band The Lightning Seeds. The music is taken from The Lightning Seeds releases between 1989 and 1992. It consists largely of non-album B-sides, along with a few album tracks and two versions of the band's hit single "The Life Of Riley".

Track listing

Notes
"Fools" and "Frenzy" also appear on the US edition of Cloudcuckooland.
"Control the Flame" also appears on Cloudcuckooland.
"Marooned" also appears on Sense.

References

The Lightning Seeds albums
2003 compilation albums